This is a list of defunct airlines of Guinea-Bissau.

See also
 List of airlines of Guinea-Bissau
 List of airports in Guinea-Bissau

References

Guinea-Bissau
Airlines
Airlines, defunct